The Gravity Gradient Test Satellite was launched by the US Air Force from Cape Canaveral LC41 aboard a Titan IIIC rocket on June 16, 1966, at 14:00:01 UTC. The satellite was launched along with seven IDCSP satellites, with which it shared a bus. In contrast to the solar-powered IDCSP satellites, GGTS was battery powered.

GGTS utilized the  Magnetically Anchored Gravity Systems (MACS), which consisted of two identical subsystem packages, each containing an extensible rod unit and a magnetically anchored spherical viscous damper. The dampers were produced by General Electric and consisted of two concentric spheres separated by a viscous damping fluid. The internal sphere contained a hollow cylindrical magnet which served to "anchor' the inner sphere to the Earth's magnetic field, stabilizing the satellite over time.

It had been hoped that within 60 days of launch, the satellite would reach a stabilization of ±8° on the x- and y-axis. The results were compromised, as one of the dampers was magnetically contaminated.

A follow-up GGTS mission was lost due to a launch vehicle failure on August 28, 1966.

See also 

 IDCSP

References

Spacecraft launched in 1966
Spacecraft launched by Titan rockets